Romana Tabak or Romana Tabaková (born 7 May 1991) is a Slovak politician and former professional tennis player. She is a former junior world No. 36, achieving that ranking in March 2008. Her career-high ranking of world No. 240 was achieved February 2012.

Political career
On 29 February 2020, she got elected in parliamentary elections and became a member of the National Council of the Slovak Republic for the political party Ordinary People along with fellow Slovak tennis players Karol Kučera and Ján Krošlák. In May 2022, she was expelled from the party, after voting against the potential prosecution of former PM Robert Fico in custody. In August, she joined the parliamentary caucus of the We Are Family party.

In late September 2022, Tabak was legally accused by a Freedom and Solidarity MP Jana Bittó Cigániková of assault in a nightclub.

Personal
Tabak was a contestant in 2007 in Slovakia's Next Top Model, but withdrew after a few episodes because of parental disapproval. In 2012, the same year Tabak reached her highest singles ranking, she was diagnosed with Lyme disease, and blamed this for damaging her development as a tennis player on the pro tour. She studied at Durham University from 2017 to 2018 on a sports scholarship.

Charitable activities
Tabak took part in missionary trips to India, Africa and Brazil and she aided Ukrainian refugees at the Main Railway Station in Bratislava in March and April 2022.

Tennis career

ITF finals

Singles (6–3)

Doubles (5–4)

Junior titles
Singles:
 Winner (2): 2007 – Piešťany – Grade 2, Prato – Grade 2

Doubles:
 Winner (2): 2008 – Umag – Grade 1 (w./Toljan); 2006 – Bratislava – Grade 4 (w./Tereza Budilova)

Awards
 2008: Junior Tennis Player of the Year in Slovak Republic

Career in review
 2003 – finished at No. 3 in Slovak ranking (U12)
 2004 – won one singles title in tournament in Slovakia, runner-up one time
 2005 – finished at No. 9 in Slovak ranking (U14); won five singles titles, runner-up two times
 2006 – finished at No. 13 in Slovak ranking (U18); won two singles titles, runner-up two times, played her first ITF junior tournament in Bratislava as WC, also won her first doubles title in junior tournament Bratislava, Grade 4
 2007 – finished at No. 4 in Slovak ranking (U18), won two junior tournaments Grade 2 in Pieštany (d. Lenka Juríková in final) and Prato (d. Bojanovski in final), made junior Grand Slam main-draw debut at Wimbledon, made top 100 debut in ITF ranking in May 2007, played in European Junior Championships U16, also played her first ITF tournament in Maribor, reached 1st round as qualifier (d. Anikó Kapros and Kristína Kučová in qualifying; l. to Lenka Tvarošková), won her first ITF doubles title in Espinho (w./Zagórska) in October
 2008 – finished at No. 1 in Slovak ranking (U18), at No. 46 in ITF ranking, at No. 588 in WTA singles ranking and at No. 481 in WTA doubles ranking, played all four junior Grand Slam tournaments: French Open – doubles SF (w./Juríková); Wimbledon – singles SF (l. to Laura Robson) – played in European Junior Championships U18, won junior doubles title Grade 1 (w./Toljan) in Umag, won one ITF singles titles in Ilawa (d. Aleksandra Rosolska in final) and two ITF doubles titles in Bucharest (w./Boczová) and Ilawa (w./Ima Bohush), was named as Junior Player of the Year 2008 in Slovakia; she also played at Wimbledon on 25 June 2008, dated Grigor Dimitrov, accompanied him at Championships Dinner at Wimbledon.
 2009 – finished at No. 678 in WTA singles ranking and at No. 349 in WTA doubles ranking, played first WTA qualifying at tournament in Prague
 2010 – finished at No. 808 in WTA singles ranking and at No. 619 in WTA doubles ranking, won one ITF singles title in Bournemouth (d. Lisa Whybourn in final) and one ITF doubles title in Antalya (w./Michaela Pochabová). From June 2010 to March 2011, she did not play any tournaments apart from the ITF Espinho tournament in October 2010 because of a knee injury.
 2011 – finished at No. 255 in WTA singles rankings and at No. 436 in WTA doubles rankings, won four ITF singles titles in Båstad ($10k, d. Brozda in final) and hat trick in Asunción ($10k, d. Irigoyen in final; $10k, d. Schiechtl in final and $25k, d. Molinero in final), Tabak was runner-up to Scarlett Werner in the ITF tournament at Bournemouth, but lost her WTA singles ranking on 9 May 2011, regaining it on 23 May 2011. 'Player of November' award according to the ITF.

References

External links
 
 
 Official website Romana Caroline Tabak (former Romana Tabaková)

Living people
1991 births
Slovak female tennis players
Top Model contestants
Tennis players from Bratislava
Alumni of Durham University
Members of the National Council (Slovakia) 2020-present
Female members of the National Council (Slovakia)
OĽaNO politicians